Postřelmov is a municipality and village in Šumperk District in the Olomouc Region of the Czech Republic. It has about 2,900 inhabitants.

Geography
It lies in the Mohelnice Depression lowland. It is situated at the confluence of the rivers Morava and Desná.

History
The first written mention of Postřelmov is from 1349. For centuries, Postřelmov was an agricultural village, but at the end of the 19th century, it was industrialised.

Sights

The landmark of Postřelmov is the Church of Saint Matthew. The original Gothic church was probably built in the 14th century, but it was destroyed by a fire in 1664 or 1665, and rebuilt in the Baroque style. In 1853, it was reconstructed and extended.

The most valuable buildings are the Renaissance tomb of the noble Bukůvka of Bukůvka family from 1592, and the early Baroque Chapel of Saint Procopius from 1696.

Notable people
Lubomír Doležel (1922–2017), literary theorist; grew up here

Twin towns – sister cities

Postřelmov is twinned with:
 Kamenec pod Vtáčnikom, Slovakia
 Moyenneville, France
 Willingham by Stow, England, United Kingdom

References

External links

Villages in Šumperk District